Berard Beach is an unincorporated community on the eastern shore of Wakaw Lake in Hoodoo No. 401, Saskatchewan, Canada.

See also 
 List of communities in Saskatchewan

References 

Hoodoo No. 401, Saskatchewan
Unincorporated communities in Saskatchewan
Division No. 15, Saskatchewan